A Day of Renew is the debut album by South Korean singer Bada, released in 2003. The album was released by Bada as a soloist.

Track listing
 Prologue
 새로운 날에 (A Day of Renew)
 Somehow Somewhere
 노을 (Noel)
 One Day
 헤어지기 전에 (Before Parting)
 Music
 Zero (Love In Vain)
 Dream Maker
 그래볼게.. (Ok..)
 This Way
 Be Mine Tonight
 집으로 오는 길 (On The Road To Home)
 Music (alternate version) [bonus track]

External links
 Bada's Official Site
 JIIN Entertainment's Official Site 
 Girl Music Official Site

2003 albums
Bada (singer) albums